Harry H. Bean is a New Hampshire politician.

Bean has a high school education.

On November 6, 2018, Bean was elected to the New Hampshire House of Representatives where he represents the Belknap 2 district. Bean assumed office on December 5, 2018. Bean is a Republican.

Bean is married and has three children.

Bean resides in Gilford, New Hampshire.

References

Living people
People from Gilford, New Hampshire
Republican Party members of the New Hampshire House of Representatives
21st-century American politicians
Year of birth missing (living people)